Eucalyptus longirostrata, commonly known as grey gum, is a species of tree that is endemic to south-east Queensland. It has smooth greyish bark, glossy green adult leaves that are paler on the lower surface, flower buds in groups of seven, white flowers and hemispherical to cup-shaped fruit.

Description
Eucalyptus longirostrata is a tree that typically grows to a height of  but does not form a lignotuber. It has smooth grey bark that is shed in strips. Flowering has been recorded in February and March and the flowers are white.

Taxonomy and naming
This grey gum was first formally described in 1934 by William Blakely who gave it the name Eucalyptus punctata var. longirostrata and published the description in his book A Key to the Eucalypts. In 1988, Lawrie Johnson and Ken Hill raised the variety to species status as E. longirostrata, publishing the change in Flora of Australia. The specific epithet (longirostrata) is from the Latin words longus meaning "long" and rostratus meaning "beaked", referring to the long, beaked operculum.

Distribution and habitat
Eucalyptus longirostrata grows in open forest on hills and ridges in Queensland, between the Blackdown Tableland and the Toowoomba district.

Conservation status
This eucalypt is classified as "least concern" under the Queensland Government Nature Conservation Act 1992.

See also
List of Eucalyptus species

References

Trees of Australia
longirostrata
Myrtales of Australia
Flora of Queensland
Plants described in 1934
Taxa named by William Blakely